Godfrey Pereira is a former Indian footballer who was last the head coach for Air India FC in the I-League.

Coaching career

Air India
On 3 July 2012, it was announced that Pereira had become coach of Air India FC after Santosh Kashyap joined Mohun Bagan. Earlier in his playing career, Pereira played for the India national football team. He coached his first match for Air India on 26 August 2012 during the 2012 Durand Cup against Delhi United FC, in which Air India won 3–0. Then on 1 September 2012 Pereira led Air India to their first ever championship in their history after they won 3–2 on penalties against Dodsal F.C. in the final of the Durand Cup.

On 27 December 2012, with Air India in 10th place in the I-League, Pereira officially resigned from his post as the head coach of the club, citing salary issues as the reason for his resigning.

Career statistics

Coach
Statistics accurate as of 27 December 2012. Include stats for all matches including league and cup. No friendlies.

References

Indian footballers

Living people
I-League managers
Air India FC players
Air India FC managers
Association footballers not categorized by position
Year of birth missing (living people)
Indian football managers